Dei Gratia was a Canadian brigantine built in Bear River, Nova Scotia in 1871. The brigantine was named after the Latin phrase for "By the Grace of God". She became famous in 1872 when, under the command of David Reed Morehouse, she discovered the ghost ship  without any crew near the Azores. Morehouse and his crew took the derelict Mary Celeste to Gibraltar and claimed the brigantine as salvage. They were at first subjected to suspicion by Gibraltar's Attorney General, but the Vice Admiralty Court later approved their salvage prize and commended the crew for their resourcefulness and courage. The hefty court expenses of the extensive probe reduced the salvage compensation, which was originally set at roughly $8,300. Only a sixth of the money was really paid. 

Dei Gratia was sold to Irish owners in 1881 and wrecked at Black Rock, Dale, Pembrokeshire after breaking her moorings in a storm on 27 December 1907. Her original ship portrait is preserved at the Maritime Museum of the Atlantic in Halifax, Nova Scotia.

References
 Stanley T. Spicer, The Saga of the Mary Celeste, (Halifax: Nimbus Press, 1993), p. 30, 42–43.
 Daniel Cohen, "Curses, Hexes, & Spells", (J. B. Lippincoti Company, 1974)

External links
  Tall Ships of Atlantic Canada – Registry Information
 Parks Canada Ship Information Database – Registry Information

Maritime history of Canada
Tall ships of Canada
Individual sailing vessels
Ships built in Nova Scotia
Victorian-era merchant ships of Canada
Sailing ships of Canada
1871 ships
Maritime incidents in 1907
Shipwrecks of Wales
Mary Celeste